Thanasi Kokkinakis and Nick Kyrgios defeated Matthew Ebden and Max Purcell in the final, 7–5, 6–4 to win the men's doubles tennis title in an all-Australian final at the 2022 Australian Open. They became the first all-Australian pair to win the title since Todd Woodbridge and Mark Woodforde in 1997, and the first wildcard champions in the Open Era. It marked the first all-Australian final since 1980.

Throughout their run, Kokkinakis and Kyrgios (dubbed "the Special K's") generated more fan fervor than usual for a doubles team. The New York Times wrote that their "mix of skill and showmanship ... has turned their matches into raucous celebrations".

Ivan Dodig and Filip Polášek were the defending champions, but did not participate together. Dodig partnered Marcelo Melo and lost to Simone Bolelli and Fabio Fognini in the second round, while Polášek partnered John Peers and lost to Marcel Granollers and Horacio Zeballos in the quarterfinals.

Seeds

Draw

Finals

Top half

Section 1

Section 2

Bottom half

Section 3

Section 4

Other entry information

Wild cards

Alternates

Withdrawals
Before the tournament
  Carlos Alcaraz /  Pablo Carreño Busta → replaced by  Daniel Altmaier /  Thiago Monteiro
  Roberto Bautista Agut /  Pedro Martínez → replaced by  Pablo Andújar /  Pedro Martínez
  Simone Bolelli /  Máximo González → replaced by  Simone Bolelli /  Fabio Fognini
  Benjamin Bonzi /  Arthur Rinderknech → replaced by  Nathaniel Lammons /  Jackson Withrow
  Marcus Daniell /  Marcelo Demoliner → replaced by  Marcus Daniell /  Frederik Nielsen
  Márton Fucsovics /  Tommy Paul → replaced by  Yoshihito Nishioka /  Jiří Veselý
  Ilya Ivashka /  Andrei Vasilevski → replaced by  Jonny O'Mara /  Andrei Vasilevski
  Steve Johnson /  Austin Krajicek → replaced by  Austin Krajicek /  Sam Querrey
  Oliver Marach /  Jonny O'Mara → replaced by  Matt Reid /  Jordan Thompson
  Denys Molchanov /  Andrey Rublev → replaced by  James Duckworth /  Marc Polmans

 During the tournament
  Jason Kubler /  Christopher O'Connell (O'Connell hip injury)

 Retirements
  Alejandro Davidovich Fokina /  Jaume Munar
  Andrey Golubev /  Franko Škugor
  Aslan Karatsev /  Artem Sitak

References

External links 

2022
2022 ATP Tour
Men's Doubles